The North Korea–Russia border, according to the official Russian definition, consists of  of "terrestrial border" and 22.1 km (12 nautical miles) of "maritime border". It is the shortest of the international borders of Russia.

Description
The terrestrial boundary between Russia and North Korea runs along the thalweg of the Tumen River and its estuary, while the maritime boundary separates the two countries' territorial waters in the Sea of Japan.

The principal border treaty was signed on April 17, 1985. A separate, trilateral treaty specifies the position of the China–North Korea–Russia tripoint. The North Korea–Russia and China–North Korea borders run along the middle of the Tumen River, while the China–Russia border approaches the junction point overland from the north. Because the theoretical tripoint is in the middle of the river, where it would be impractical to install a border monument, the agreement provides instead that the three countries install border monuments on the riverbank, and that the position of the tripoint be determined with respect to those monuments.

The administrative unit on the Russian side of the border is the Khasansky District of Primorsky Krai; on the Korean side, it is the city of Rason. The main Russian border guard station in the area is Peschanaya.

History
The border between the Russian Empire and the Korean Kingdom, then a tributary state of the Qing dynasty, was established by the Convention of Peking in November 1860. Under the agreement, the Qing dynasty ceded territories east of the Ussuri River to the Russians. The original description of the border included the lower course of the Tumen River - the last 20 li (about ) - as its southernmost section, leaving the rest of the course of the river as a Korea-Russian boundary by default. A wooden pillar was then erected marking the tripoint, which was later replaced with a more permanent pillar in c. 1886.

The existence of Korea as a separate country was not mentioned in the 1860 convention between Russia and China, but in the late 19th and early 20th centuries, Chinese influence in Korea waned and Japanese influence grew. The Treaty of Shimonoseki in 1895 ended the tributary relationship with Korea, and the Japan–Korea Treaty of 1905 made Korea a protectorate of Japan. The Japan–Korea Treaty of 1910 finalised Japan's annexation of Korea. Thus, the Tumen River became a border between the Russian Empire (later, the Soviet Union) and the Japanese Empire; this continued until the end of Japanese rule in Korea in 1945.

In 1985, the Soviet Union and North Korea signed an agreement establishing a border along the middle of the Tumen. The former Noktundo Island,  in size, was recognized by North Korea as part of Russia. This agreement was not accepted by South Korea, which continues to view Noktundo as Korean territory.

In the second half of the 20th century, thousands of North Korean refugees and displaced people crossed the border. Their descendants now live throughout Russia and other Commonwealth of Independent States countries.

Border crossing

On the North Korean side, the border train station is at Tumangang. The crossing is railway-only, used by freight and passenger trains, but planks laid between the tracks make crossing of road vehicles possible by special arrangement.

Passenger train service over the Friendship Bridge includes a Khasan–Tumangang shuttle, as well as a Korean State Railway direct car on the Moscow–Pyongyang route. The direct car travels from Moscow to Ussuriysk with a Moscow–Vladivostok train, to Khasan with an Ussuriysk–Khasan train, across the border with the Khasan–Tumangang shuttle train, and then to Pyongyang with a domestic Korean train. At  total, this is the longest direct (one-seat ride) passenger rail service in the world.

Normally, the crossing is used only by citizens of Russia and North Korea, and is not open to nationals of other countries. In 2008, however, two Western tourists managed to enter North Korea from Russia by taking a train over the Friendship Bridge. In 2019, a Western-run travel agency specializing in North Korea tourism announced a Moscow–Pyongyang train tour that would also use the Khasan–Tumangang border crossing.

In April 2015, the deputy transport ministers of Russia and North Korea—Nikolai Asaul and Kwok Il-ryong, respectively—signed an agreement to develop a road connection between the two countries.

Riverbank protection
Because the North Korean side of the river is mountainous and the Russian side is lower, shore erosion may cause the Tumen River, which floods annually, to gradually change its course toward the Russian side. (A similar phenomenon is seen on the China–Russia border, with the Amur River). To prevent the loss of national territory, and to shield Khasan and the Peschanaya border guard station from flooding, Russian authorities carried out a riverbank protection project using rock fill from 2004 to 2008.

Incidents 
On 16 October 2016, a Russian border guard killed a North Korean fisherman and injured eight others after opening fire on a fishing vessel in the Sea of Japan. The Federal Security Service (FSB) claimed the vessel, trawler Dae Yong No. 10, was encroaching in Russian waters in the Sea of Japan on Saturday. During a search of the vessel, the FSB guards found "illegally obtained aquatic bio-resources" on board, a statement said. The statement says the ship then attempted to flee while its crewmembers tried to wrest weapons from the Russian guards. A Russian coast guard ship fired at the trawler's propulsion system, disabling it, and on the North Korean crewmen, the statement said.

On 17 September 2019, the FSB said a Russian Coast Guard ship detected two North Korean vessels and 11 motorboats fishing illegally in Russian territorial waters. While one of the vessels was detained, the crew of the other opened fire, wounding four Russian servicemen before it was captured, along with the 11 motorboats, according to the FSB. A total of 161 North Koreans were detained, including some wounded in the confrontation, who were given medical assistance. Both North Korean vessels, their crews, and 11 motorboats were taken to the Russian port of Nakhodka, where they are expected to stay till the end of the investigation.

On 18 September 2019, Russia summoned the top North Korean diplomat in the country over a skirmish between the coast guard and fishing vessels in the Sea of Japan. Russia's Foreign Ministry expressed "serious concern" over the incident to Jin Jong-hyeop, the interim chargé d'affaires at the North Korean Embassy in Moscow. This is not the first time the countries have had run-ins in the region. North Korea has previously seized Russian boats. In July, it arrested a fishing crew.

Gallery

References

External links

The Tumen River Documentation Project at Sino-NK
 Frank Jacobs, Manchurian Trivia  February 21, 2012
Photo of border
International Boundary Study No. 59 – December 5, 1965 Korea – U.S.S.R. Boundary
Border marker at 9:28

 
North Korea–Russia relations
North Hamgyong
Primorsky Krai
Borders of North Korea
Borders of Russia
International borders